Pilodeudorix deritas, the small diopetes, is a butterfly in the family Lycaenidae. It is found in Ghana, Nigeria (the southern part of the country and the Cross River loop), Cameroon, the Republic of the Congo, Angola, the Central African Republic, the Democratic Republic of the Congo (Uele, Equateur and Kwango) and Uganda. The habitat consists of forests.

Both sexes are attracted to flowers.

References

External links
Die Gross-Schmetterlinge der Erde 13: Die Afrikanischen Tagfalter. Plate XIII 66 b
Die Gross-Schmetterlinge der Erde 13: Die Afrikanischen Tagfalter. Plate XIII 68 a

Butterflies described in 1874
Deudorigini
Butterflies of Africa
Taxa named by William Chapman Hewitson